Anovi (also Romanized as ʿAnovī; also known as Anovī-ye Pelāsī, Pālāsī, and Takhteh Pūrī-ye Pelāsī) is a village in Chubar Rural District, Haviq District, Talesh County, Gilan Province, Iran. At the 2006 census, its population was 345, in 78 families.

References 

Populated places in Talesh County